Tour Franklin is an office skyscraper located in La Défense business district situated west of Paris, France.

Built in 1972, the tower of 120 metres of height belongs to the second generation of skyscrapers in La Défense. Its design consists of the merger of a smaller tower in a larger one.

See also 
 Skyscraper
 La Défense
 List of tallest structures in Paris

External links 
 Tour Franklin (Emporis)

Franklin
Franklin
Office buildings completed in 1972